Richard Müller/Muller/Mueller may refer to:
 Richard Müller (chemist) (1903–1999), German chemist
 Richard Müller (general) (1891–1943), German general and Knight's Cross recipient
 Richard Müller (singer) (born 1961),  Slovak singer
 Richard Müller (socialist) (1880–1943), German socialist, unionist and one of the main protagonists of the German Revolution in 1918
 Richard A. Muller (born 1944), physicist and professor 
 Richard Muller (theologian) (born 1948), Reformation scholar, and professor
 Richard R. Muller, professor of airpower history
 Richard S. Muller (born 1933), American professor of electrical engineering
 Richard Müller (artist), professor at the Dresden Academy of Fine Arts
 Richard Mueller, screenwriter on TV series such as Hypernauts